The Kiev 35A is a semi-automatic 35 mm camera made by the Soviet Kiev-Arsenal factory. A copy of the Minox 35 camera and similar to Minox 35EL; it is small and lightweight. It is sometimes compared to the LOMO LC-A camera.

The camera is notable for its unreliability, light leaks and many electronic flaws (like failure to open shutter).

Specifications
Lens: MC KORSAR 35mm f/2.8
Focusing: scale-focus, 1m to infinity
Aperture: f2.8 to f16
Shutter speeds: continuously variable, 1/500s to 4s
Flash: X-sync at 1/30s, hot shoe
Exposure: aperture-priority semi-automatic
Film type: 135 film
ISO settings: 25, 50, 100, 200, 400, and 800
Battery: four Maxell LR-43 or equivalent total 6V
Size: 101.5x64x32.5 mm
Weight: 180g

References

External links
Operating Instructions in English
Mystery of KIEV 35A light leak

Soviet cameras